Batley is a surname of English origin. It is likely derived from the town of Batley in West Yorkshire.

Notable people with the surname include:

 Robert Thompson Batley (1849–1917), British settler in New Zealand
 Ernest Batley (1874–1965), British actor and film director
 Ethyle Batley (1876–1917), British actor and filmmaker
 James Batley (1876–1964), British golfer
 Claude Batley (1879–1956), British–Indian architect
 Lawrence Batley (1911–2002), British businessman and philanthropist
 Noeleen Batley (born 1944), Australian musician
 Loui Batley (born 1987), British actor
 Joe Batley (born 1996), British rugby player
 Jamie Batley, lacrosse coach
 Norman Batley, radio presenter

See also 
 Battley

References 

Surnames of English origin
English-language surnames
English toponymic surnames
Batley